XXXX may refer to:

Arts and entertainment
 XXXX (album), by You Say Party! We Say Die!, 2009
 XXXX, the main character in the 2004 film Layer Cake

Organisations
 XXXX Panzer Corps, a tank corps in the German Army during World War II
 XXXX Reserve Corps, a German military formation

Other uses
 Castlemaine XXXX, a brand of beer
 XXXX Bitter
 XXXX Gold
 XXXX Summer Bright Lager
 Mr Fourex, the beer's mascot
 XXXX Island, also Pumpkin Island, a privately owned island
 XXXX syndrome, Tetrasomy X, a chromosomal disorder
 XXXX, or Fourecks, the Australia-inspired continent in Terry Pratchett's Discworld series

See also 

 4X (disambiguation)
 X (disambiguation)
 XX (disambiguation)
 XXX (disambiguation)